Adelaide of Hesse (after 1323 – after May 26, 1371) was queen consort of Poland by marriage to Casimir III of Poland. She was daughter of Henry II, Landgrave of Hesse, and his wife Elisabeth of Thuringia, daughter of Frederick I, Margrave of Meissen. Adelaide was a member of the House of Hesse.

Biography
She was named after her paternal grandmother.

Unhappy marriage
On September 29, 1341, in Poznań, Adelaide married Casimir III the Great, King of Poland. The marriage was a result of an agreement between Casimir III and Luxemburgs.

The marriage was Casimir's second marriage, after the death of his first wife, Aldona of Lithuania. Casimir had no male heir, though he had two daughters, Elizabeth and Kunigunde. On September 29, 1341, Adelaide was crowned in Poznań Cathedral. The marriage was an unhappy one, Casimir started living separately from Adelaide soon after their marriage.

Annulment
Their loveless marriage lasted until 1356. Casimir separated from Adelaide and married his mistress Christina. Christina was the widow of Miklusz Rokiczani, a wealthy merchant. The bigamy and his womanizing Casimir got into severe trouble with the clergy.

Casimir continued living with Christina despite complaints by Pope Innocent VI on behalf of Adelaide. The marriage lasted until 1363/1364 when Casimir again declared himself divorced. They had no children. The marriage to Adelaide was annulled in 1368. Then Casimir married his fourth wife, Jadwiga (Hedwig) of Żagań.
This marriage produced another three daughters.

With Adelaide still alive and Christina possibly as well, the marriage to Jadwiga was also considered bigamous. The legitimacy of the three last daughters was disputed. Casimir managed to have two of his daughters, Anna and Kunigunde, legitimatized by Pope Urban V on December 5, 1369. Jadwiga the younger, was legitimatized by Pope Gregory XI on October 1, 1371.

Later life
After the annulment of her marriage, Adelaide went back home to Hesse. She spent the rest of her life in Hesse.

After her ex-husband's death, she fought for her property rights. She intervened in this case to Pope Gregory XI. On May 26, 1371, the Pope urged King Louis to give back her property.

In popular culture

Film 
Queen Adelaide is one of the main characters in the second season of Polish historical TV drama series "Korona Królów" ("The Crown of the Kings"). She is played by Aleksandra Przesław.

Further reading 
Balzer Oswald: Genealogia Piastów. Kraków 1895, p. 386-387.
Paszkiewicz H.: Adelajda. In: Polski Słownik Biograficzny. Vol. 1. 1935, p. 28.
Semkowicz Aleksander: Adelajda, Krystyna, Jadwiga, żony Kazimierza Wielkiego. Kwartalnik Historyczny 12. 1898, p. 561-566.

|-

1324 births
1371 deaths
14th-century Polish people
14th-century Polish women
House of Hesse
Polish queens consort
Casimir III the Great
Daughters of monarchs